The Chilliwack Cultural Centre is a performing arts venue located in downtown Chilliwack, one hour east of Vancouver, British Columbia. The $22 million cultural facility celebrated its grand opening on September 25, 2010 with a concert by Lisa Howard, Jason Graae, David Burnham, Jessica Hendy, and Scott Coulter.

The facility is located on City-owned land at The Landing, adjacent to existing sports and recreation facilities, as well as Prospera Centre, and took two years to build.

Events 
In addition to the resident theatre company, the Players Guild, the venue has hosted other concerts and events, including Mickey Rooney, The Rankin Sisters, Nazereth, April Wine and Outerbridge: Magical Moments in Time.

References 
Henderson, Paul (2010-07-02). "Centre of attention" Chilliwack Times. Retrieved 2010-12-09
Henderson, Paul (2010-09-10). "Four top Broadway entertainers will perform" Chilliwack Times. Retrieved 2010-12-09
Morris, Honor (2010-10-06). "Canadian centre sets tallest tilt-up concrete panel record" Construction Canada. Retrieved 2010-12-09

External links 
Official Site

Theatres in British Columbia
Chilliwack